Riverside High School is a senior high school in Avon, Mississippi. It is a part of the Western Line School District. It serves junior high school and senior high school levels.

References

External links
 
 

Schools in Washington County, Mississippi
Public high schools in Mississippi
Public middle schools in Mississippi